Luxullianite (also known as luxulyanite or luxulianite) is a rare type of porphyritic granite, notable for the presence of clusters of radially-arranged acicular tourmaline crystals enclosed by phenocrysts of orthoclase and quartz in a matrix of quartz, tourmaline, alkali feldspar, brown mica, and cassiterite.

The name originates from the village of Luxulyan in Cornwall, United Kingdom, where this type of granite is found. An example may be seen in the Duke of Wellington's tomb in St Paul's Cathedral in London.

References

External links

 Microscopic images of luxullianite. Siddall, R. (2014), Minerals Menu: a catalogue of minerals & textures in thin section.

Granitic rocks
Geology of Cornwall